Valerie Kathryn Harper (August 22, 1939 – August 30, 2019) was an American actress. She began her career as a dancer on Broadway, making her debut as a replacement in the musical Li'l Abner. She is best remembered for her role as Rhoda Morgenstern on The Mary Tyler Moore Show (1970–1977) and its spinoff Rhoda (1974–1978). For her work on Mary Tyler Moore, she thrice received the Primetime Emmy Award for Outstanding Supporting Actress in a Comedy Series, and later received the award for Outstanding Lead Actress in a Comedy Series for Rhoda. From 1986 to 1987, she appeared as Valerie Hogan on the sitcom Valerie, which she subsequently left for salary reasons. Her character was killed off, and the show was retitled Valerie's Family and eventually The Hogan Family. Actress Sandy Duncan was cast in a new role that served as a replacement for Harper's character. Her film appearances include roles in Freebie and the Bean (1974) and Chapter Two (1979), both of which garnered her Golden Globe Award nominations. She returned to stage work in her later career, appearing in several Broadway productions. In 2010, she was nominated for the Tony Award for Best Actress in a Play for her performance as Tallulah Bankhead in the play Looped.

Early life 
Harper was born on August 22, 1939, in Suffern, New York, the daughter of Iva Mildred (née McConnell) and Howard Donald Harper. Her father was a lighting salesman; her mother was born (and raised) in Dalmeny, Saskatchewan, before becoming a teacher and later training as a nurse. Her parents married in Alberta before her mother immigrated to the United States.
Valerie was the middle child of three, between her sister Leanne and her brother Merrill, who later took the name "Don". After her parents' divorce in 1957, she also had a half-sister, Virginia,
from her father's second marriage to Angela Posillico (1933–1996).

She stated that her parents were expecting a boy.  But after her arrival her first and middle names were derived from tennis players Valerie Scott and Kay Stammers who were victorious doubles partners at a tournament Harper’s father was attending the day she was born. She was of French, English, Irish, Scottish, and Welsh ancestry. Harper based her character Rhoda Morgenstern on her Italian stepmother and Penny Ann Green (née Joanna Greenberg), with whom she danced in the Broadway musical Wildcat. She was raised Catholic, although at an early age she "quit" the church.

Her family moved every two years due to her father's work. Harper attended schools in South Orange, New Jersey; Pasadena, California; Monroe, Michigan; Ashland, Oregon; and Jersey City, New Jersey. When her family returned to Oregon, she stayed in the New York City area to study ballet. She attended Lincoln High School in Jersey City, New Jersey before graduating from the private Young Professionals School on West 56th Street, where classmates included Sal Mineo, Tuesday Weld, and Carol Lynley.

Career

Broadway dancer and improv 
Harper began her show business career as a dancer and chorus girl on Broadway, and went on to perform in several Broadway shows, some choreographed by Michael Kidd, including Wildcat (starring Lucille Ball), Li'l Abner, Take Me Along (starring Jackie Gleason), and Subways Are for Sleeping. She was also cast in the musical Destry Rides Again, but was forced to leave rehearsals due to illness. She returned to Broadway in February 2010, playing Tallulah Bankhead in Matthew Lombardo's Looped at the Lyceum Theatre.

Harper had a bit part in the film version of Li'l Abner (1959), playing a Yokumberry Tonic wife. She broke into television on an episode of the soap opera The Doctors ("Zip Guns can Kill"), and was an extra in Love with the Proper Stranger. She was in the ensemble cast of Paul Sills' Story Theatre and toured with Second City along with then-husband Richard Schaal, Linda Lavin, and others, later appearing in sketches on Playboy After Dark. She performed several characters in a comedy LP record, When You're in Love the Whole World is Jewish, which included the popular novelty single, The Ballad of Irving, a recitation by TV announcer Frank Gallop. Harper and Schaal moved to Los Angeles in 1968, and co-wrote an episode of Love, American Style.

Television 

While doing theater in Los Angeles in 1970, Harper was spotted by casting agent Ethel Winant, who called her in to audition for the role of Rhoda Morgenstern on The Mary Tyler Moore Show. She co-starred there from 1970 to 1974, then starred in the spinoff series Rhoda (CBS 1974–1978) in which her character returned to New York City.

She won four Emmy Awards and a Golden Globe Award for her work as Rhoda Morgenstern. In 2000, she reunited with Moore in Mary and Rhoda, a television film that reunited their characters in later life. The first season of Rhoda was released on DVD on April 21, 2009 by Shout! Factory.

Harper was nominated for a Golden Globe for "New Star of the Year" for her role in Freebie and the Bean (1974), and was a guest star on The Muppet Show in 1976, its first season.

Harper returned to situation comedy in 1986 when she played family matriarch Valerie Hogan on the NBC series Valerie. Following a salary dispute with NBC and production company Lorimar in 1987, she was fired from the series at the end of its second season, and she sued NBC and Lorimar for breach of contract. Her claims against NBC were dismissed, but the jury found that Lorimar had wrongfully fired her and awarded her $1.4 million plus 12.5% of the show's profits. The series continued without her, with the explanation that her character had died offscreen. In 1987, it was initially renamed Valerie's Family, then The Hogan Family, as Harper was replaced by Sandy Duncan, who played her sister-in-law Sandy Hogan.

Harper appeared in various television films, including a performance as Maggie in a production of the Michael Cristofer play The Shadow Box, directed by Paul Newman, and in guest roles on such series as Melrose Place (1998) and Sex and the City (1999).

Later career 

Harper was a member of the Screen Actors Guild (SAG) and ran for its presidency in 2001, losing to Melissa Gilbert. She served on SAG's Hollywood board of directors.

In 2005–2006, Harper portrayed Golda Meir in a United States national tour of the one-woman drama Golda's Balcony. A film of the production was released in 2007.

She played Tallulah Bankhead in the world-premiere production of Matthew Lombardo's Looped at the Pasadena Playhouse from June 27 to August 3, 2008. The show moved to Arena Stage in Washington, D.C., in 2009. It then briefly ran on Broadway at the Lyceum Theatre, from February 2010 (previews) through April 2010, for which Harper received a Tony Award nomination. She was to continue the role on a national tour beginning January 2013, but withdrew due to her health.

She played Claire Bremmer, aunt of Susan Delfino (Teri Hatcher), on ABC's Desperate Housewives in 2011.

On September 4, 2013, Harper was announced as a contestant for the 17th season of Dancing with the Stars, partnered with professional dancer Tristan MacManus. They were eliminated from the show on October 7, 2013.

Harper appeared as the character Wanda on the American comedy web television series Liza on Demand, in its July 11, 2018, episode: "Valentine's Day".

Activism and charity work 
In the 1970s and '80s, Harper was involved in the women's liberation movement and was an advocate of the Equal Rights Amendment. With Dennis Weaver she co-founded L.I.F.E. (Love Is Feeding Everyone) in 1983, a charity that fed thousands of needy people in Los Angeles.

Personal life 
Harper's NYC roommate was Arlene Golonka.

Harper married actor Richard Schaal in 1964. They divorced in 1978, after which she had a relationship with Peter Horton. She married Tony Cacciotti in 1987, after dating for seven years, and they adopted a daughter, Cristina. 

Despite playing Jewish characters such as Rhoda Morgenstern, Harper herself was not Jewish.

Illness and death 
In 2009, Harper was diagnosed with lung cancer. She announced on March 6, 2013, that tests from a January hospital stay revealed she had leptomeningeal carcinomatosis, a rare condition where cancer cells spread into the meninges, the membranes surrounding the brain. She explained her doctors had given her as little as three months to live. Although the disease was considered incurable, her doctors said they were treating her with chemotherapy to try to slow its progress.

In April 2014, Harper said she was responding well to the treatment. On July 30, 2015, she was hospitalized in Maine after falling unconscious, and taken via medevac to a larger hospital for further treatment. She was later discharged.

In 2016, Harper's cancer continued, with treatment at Cedars-Sinai Medical Center, but she was well enough to appear in a short film, My Mom and the Girl, based on the experiences of director/writer Susie Singer Carter, whose mother has Alzheimer's disease. In September 2017, she said: "People are saying, 'She's on her way to death and quickly'. Now it's five years instead of three months... I'm going to fight this. I'm going to see a way." At the time, she was developing a television series with Carter.

By July 2019, she was on a regimen of "a multitude of medications and chemotherapy drugs" and was experiencing "extreme physical and painful challenges" that required "around-the-clock, 24/7 care." Harper died on the morning of August 30, 2019, in Los Angeles.

Filmography

Films 
{| class="wikitable sortable"
|-
! Year
! Title
! Role
! class="unsortable" | Notes
|-
| 1956
| Rock, Rock, Rock!
| Dancer at Prom
| Uncredited
|-
| 1959
| Li'l Abner
| Luke's Wife
| Uncredited
|-
| 1963
| Trash Program
| Wife
| Voice, uncredited
|-
| 1969
| With a Feminine Touch
| 
| 
|-
| 1973
| 
| Herself
| rowspan=2|Television film
|-
| rowspan=2|1974
| Thursday's Game
| Ann Menzente
|-
| Freebie and the Bean
| Consuelo
| Nominated — Golden Globe Award for New Star of the Year – Actress
|-
| 1977
| Night Terror
| Carol Turner
| Television film
|-
| 1979
| Chapter Two
| Faye Medwick
| Nominated — Golden Globe Award for Best Supporting Actress – Motion Picture
|-
| rowspan=3|1980
| 
| Barbara
| 
|-
| Fun and Games
| Carol Hefferman
|rowspan=6|Television film
|-
| 
| Maggie
|-
| 1981
| The Day the Loving Stopped
| Norma Danner
|-
| rowspan=2|1982
| Farrell for the People
| Elizabeth "Liz" Farrell
|-
| Don't Go to Sleep
| Laura
|-
| 1983
| 
| Kate Bianchi
|-
| 1984
| Blame It on Rio
| Karen Hollis
| 
|-
| 1985
| 
| Hannah Epstein
| rowspan=12|Television film
|-
| 1987
| Strange Voices
| Lynn Glover
|-
| rowspan=2|1988
| Drop-Out Mother
| Nora Cromwell
|-
| 
| Rachel Yoman
|-
| 1990
| Stolen: One Husband
| Katherine Slade
|-
| 1991
| Perry Mason: The Case of the Fatal Fashion
| Dyan Draper
|-
| 1993
| 
| Herself
|-
| 1994
| 
| Mrs. Delvecchio
|-
| 1995
| 
| Grace Venessi
|-
| 1997
| Dog's Best Friend
| Chicken (voice)
|-
| 2000
| Mary and Rhoda
| Rhoda Morgenstern-Rousseau
|-
| 2002
| Dancing at the Harvest Moon
| Claire
|-
| 2007
| Golda's Balcony
| Golda Meir
| 
|-
| rowspan=4|2011
| Shiver
| Audrey Alden
| 
|-
| My Future Boyfriend
| Bobbi Moreau
| rowspan=2|Television film
|-
| Fixing Pete
| Mrs. Friedlander
|-
| Certainty
| Kathryn
| 
|-
| 2014
| ''The Town That Came A-Courtin| Charlotte
| Television film
|-
| 2015
| Merry Xmas
| Mother
| 7 minute short
|-
| rowspan=2|2016
| My Mom and the Girl
| Norma/Nanny
| 22 minute short
|-
| Stars in Shorts: No Ordinary Love
| Mother
| Merry Xmas segment
|}

 Television 

Web

 Theater 

 Awards and nominations 

 References Bibliography'''

External links 

 
 John Denver Rocky Mountain Christmas 1975 TV Special (with Valerie Harper)
 
 
 
 
 
 

1939 births
2019 deaths
20th-century American actresses
20th-century American comedians
21st-century American actresses
21st-century American comedians
21st-century American women
Actresses from New Jersey
Actresses from New York (state)
Actresses from Oregon
Actresses from California
American film actresses
American memoirists
American people of French-Canadian descent
American people of English descent
American people of Irish descent
American people of Scottish descent
American people of Welsh descent
American stage actresses
American television actresses
American women comedians
Best Musical or Comedy Actress Golden Globe (television) winners
Burials at Hollywood Forever Cemetery
Deaths from brain cancer in the United States
Deaths from cancer in California
Neurological disease deaths in California
Former Roman Catholics
Lincoln High School (New Jersey) alumni
Outstanding Performance by a Lead Actress in a Comedy Series Primetime Emmy Award winners
Outstanding Performance by a Supporting Actress in a Comedy Series Primetime Emmy Award winners
Participants in American reality television series
People from Jersey City, New Jersey
People from Suffern, New York
American women memoirists
Writers from New Jersey
Writers from New York (state)
Writers from Oregon